Serra da Mantiqueira Environmental Protection Area ( is a protected area of Brazil that includes parts of the states of Minas Gerais, Rio de Janeiro and São Paulo.

Location

It is administered by the Chico Mendes Institute for Biodiversity Conservation.
It is part of the Mantiqueira Mosaic of conservation units.

The area includes parts of the states of Minas Gerais, Rio de Janeiro and São Paulo.
In Minas Gerais it includes the municipalities of Aiuruoca, Alagoa, Bocaina de Minas, Baependi, Delfim Moreira, Itamonte, Itanhandu, Liberdade, Marmelópolis, Passa Quatro, Passa-Vinte, Piranguçu, Pouso Alto, Virgínia and Wenceslau Braz.
In Rio de Janeiro it includes the municipalities of Itatiaia and Resende.
In  São Paulo it includes the municipalities of Campos do Jordão, Cruzeiro, Guaratinguetá, Lorena, Lavrinhas, Pindamonhangaba, Piquete, Queluz, Santo Antônio do Pinhal, São Bento do Sapucaí.

Environment

It includes the peaks of Pedra da Mina [], Pico dos Três Estados [] and Pico dos Marins [].

Vegetation is mostly from the Atlantic Forest ecosystem.
Below  it is mostly dense montane rainforest.
From  there is mixed dense rainforest and upper montane forest, with specimens of Araucaria angustifolia (Brazilian pine). 
Above  there are areas of open fields or rocky fields.
Endemic fauna include the Maldonada redbelly toad (Melanophryniscus moreirae).
Migratory species include the great egret (Ardea alba), snowy egret (Egretta thula) and striated heron  (Butorides striata).

Conservation

The protection area is classed as IUCN protected area category V (protected landscape/seascape.
The purpose is to ensure conservation of the landscape and regional culture of the Mantiqueira Mountains, to protect and preserve endemic and Andean flora and remnants of the Araucaria forests, to preserve continuity of vegetation coverage along the central mountain spine, and to preserve the original vegetation and wildlife, particularly endangered species.
Protected species include the ocelot (Leopardus pardalis mitis) and black-capped piprites (Piprites pileata).

Notes

Sources

Environmental protection areas of Brazil
Protected areas of São Paulo (state)
Protected areas of Minas Gerais
Protected areas of Rio de Janeiro (state)